The Intelligence and Terrorism Information Center (ITIC), also known as Meir Amit Intelligence and Terrorism Information Center in honor of Meir Amit, is an Israeli-based research group with ties to the Israel Defense Forces and support from the American Jewish Congress. The organisation is part of the Israel Intelligence Heritage and Commemoration Center (IICC).

Establishment and organization 
The Meir Amit Intelligence and Terrorism Information Center (ITIC) was established in 2002. It is directed by Colonel (Ret.) Reuven Erlich, a former IDF intelligence officer. According to its website, the center is part of the Israel Intelligence Heritage and Commemoration Center (IICC), an NGO dedicated to the memory of the fallen of the Israeli Intelligence Community.

The organization has close ties with Israel's military leadership and maintains an office at the Israeli Defense Ministry. 

Several former members of the Israeli intelligence community (Mossad, Military Intelligence, the Shin Bet and Nativ) have criticized the "symbiotic" relationship between the center and Israeli military intelligence and the center's establishment, arguing that the connection of military intelligence with a propaganda body would be detrimental to "objective" and "ideologically unbiased" analysis. Steven Erlanger wrote in The New York Times that a spokesman for the center had acknowledged that it had received some Israeli government financing.

Activities 

The center's research staff, some of whom are former Military Intelligence officers, compile weekly reports that are published online at their website.

Main topics of the center are the "Palestinian terrorist organizations", the Palestinian Authority, Hezbollah in Lebanon, the "campaign to delegitimize Israel", financing and marketing terrorism, and the states which sponsor terrorism (especially Iran and Syria), anti-Semitism, radical Islam, global jihad and Al-Qaeda, and the Israeli-Palestinian conflict.

In 2010 the center published a research on Operation Cast Lead as a response to the Goldstone report. The study concluded that Hamas made use of civilian infrastructures and population (including children) as human shields.

References

External links
 Intelligence and Terrorism Information Center (main website)
 Intelligence and Terrorism Information Center (in English)

Counterterrorist organizations
Non-profit organizations based in Israel
Non-governmental organizations involved in the Israeli–Palestinian conflict
Organizations established in 2002
2002 establishments in Israel
Research institutes in Israel

he:המרכז למורשת המודיעין#מרכז המידע למודיעין ולטרור